Michael Brüggeman(n) (1583, Stolp – 1654) was a German Lutheran pastor, preacher and translator living in the town of Schmolsin (Smołdzino), Duchy of Pomerania. He was born in Stolp (now Słupsk).

Acting on the request of the last Griffin duchess, Anna von Croy, Brüggemann translated several liturgical texts, hymnals, prayer books and funeral speeches into Slovincian, a dialect of Kashubian. He also preached regularly in that language.

1583 births
1654 deaths
People from Słupsk
17th-century German Lutheran clergy
People from the Duchy of Pomerania
German male non-fiction writers
17th-century German translators